Eldho is common first (given) male name of St Thomas Christians in the South Indian state of Kerala. Variations of the name are Eldo / Yeldho / Eldhos / Eldhose; Yeldos or Eldos (in Kazakhstan). The name is of Aramaic origin and means "Birth of the Christ". The persons given the name of Eldho / Yeldho are normally baptized in Mar Thoma Cheria Pally (St Thomas Church) at Kothamangalam, Kerala India.

The person is named Eldho / Yeldho in honour of the Saint Baselios Yeldo.

Notable people with Eldho name and derivatives
 Baselios Yeldo (1593–1685), Saint of the Syriac Orthodox Church
 Eldo Abraham, Indian Politician
 Eldhose Kunnappilly, Indian Politician
 Eldo T. Ridgway (1880–1955), American Physician and Politician

See also
Yeldos
Eldo

References